Dark Arms: Beast Buster 1999 is an action role-playing game released by SNK for the Neo-Geo Pocket Color in 1999. It is a spin-off follow-up to the SNK arcade shooter Beast Busters.

Gameplay 
Dark Arms features a girl, Meghan Loughlin, whose job is to defeat and contain an outbreak of demons and act as a mediator between this world and the next.

The player can collect the spirits of the various demons and zombies they fight in the game with a gun known as "The Catcher".

The player-character can then use captured spirits to 'feed' their weapons and evolve them into more powerful forms. For example, the Handgun evolves into the Sub Shotgun, which can evolve further into the Shotgun.

Reception 

Dark Arms: Beast Buster received mixed reception from critics since its release.

In 2014, HobbyConsolass Álvaro Alonso identified Dark Arms: Beast Buster as one of the twenty best games for the Neo Geo Pocket Color.

Notes

References

External links 

 Dark Arms: Beast Buster at GameFAQs
 Dark Arms: Beast Buster at MobyGames

1999 video games
Action role-playing video games
Neo Geo Pocket Color games
Single-player video games
SNK games
Run and gun games
Top-down video games
Video game sequels
Video game spin-offs
Video games about demons
Video games about zombies
Video games featuring female protagonists
Video games developed in Japan